The Universidade Metodista de São Paulo (Methodist University of São Paulo), also known as UMESP or simply Metodista, is a private university based in the city of São Bernardo do Campo, in the state of São Paulo, Brazil.

Metodista currently enrolls over 18,000 students, with most popular programs in the areas of communications and theology.

History
Metodista traces its history to 1938, when the Methodists created the Methodist Church Theology College by the Anchieta highway, in São Bernardo do Campo. In 1970, the Methodist Institute of Higher Education (Portuguese: Instituto Metodista de Ensino Superior—IMS) was created and in 1997, and the institution gained university status.

Graduate programs
The school offers 40 different graduate and over 60 post-grad programs. It also offers K through 11 programs.

Notable former pupils
Among many notable alumni are: Celso Zucatelli, Reinaldo Azevedo and Paulo Vinícius Coelho who graduated in journalism, and Dalton Vigh who graduated in Publicity and Advertising.

Campus
The university has, in total, three campi in São Bernardo:
 Rudge Ramos
 Vergueiro
 Planalto

See also 
 Free Methodist College

External links
 Official site

References

Methodist universities and colleges
Universities and colleges in São Paulo
1938 establishments in Brazil
Educational institutions established in 1938
Christian universities and colleges in Brazil